Glyn Parry is an Australian writer of children's literature, young adult fiction, and speculative fiction.

Biography
Parry was born in 1959 in the north-east of England. At the age of 12 he moved to Lynwood, Western Australia where he attended Kinlock Primary School and then Rossmoyne Senior High School. Parry met his wife at a Friday night youth group with whom he raised three children. He has worked as a high school English teacher. In 1992 Parry's first novel was published entitled L.A. Postcards. In 1995 his second novel Radical Take-offs won the Premier's Prize and the award for best Children's & Young Adult's Books at the Western Australian Premier's Book Awards. Parry again won an award at the Western Australian Premier's Book Awards with his work Scooterboy winning the Young Adults Award. He is now currently living in West Toodyay, Western Australia.

Awards and nominations

Bibliography

Novels
L.A. Postcards (1992)
Monster Man (1994)
Radical Take-offs (1994)
Mosh (1996)
Spooking the Cows (2002)
Sad Boys (1998)
Scooterboy (1999)
Ocean Road (2007)

Non-fiction
Stoked!: Real Life,Real Surf (1994)

Chapter books
Harry & Luke (2002, illustrations by Caroline Magerl)

Collections
Invisible Girl: Stories (2003)

Short fiction
"Dawn Chorus" (1998) in Fantastic Worlds (ed. Paul Collins)
"Past Midnight" (1999) in Last Gasps (ed. Paul Collins, Meredith Costain)

References
General
Glyn Parry. Fantastic Fiction. Retrieved 2010-12-27.
Parry, Glyn, 1959-. National Library of Australia. Retrieved 2010-12-27.
Specific

External links

Glyn Parry's blog

1959 births
Australian children's writers
Australian male short story writers
Living people
English emigrants to Australia
People educated at Rossmoyne Senior High School